Anthony Gaudioso and James Gaudioso (birth date November 29) are American identical twin actors, producers, and directors known for Medium (2007), The Ghost and The Whale (2017), Duke (2019) and the upcoming The Skulleton.

Early life 
Born in Crystal Lake, Illinois and later raised in Long Island, the twins began a career in acting at an early age, appearing in mainstream commercials and off-Broadway shows. In 1997, they were discovered by Spike Lee during a national search of over twenty thousand New Yorkers to be featured in a string of commercials for Nike and Finish Line. In an effort to further pursue their interests, Anthony went on to receive a film degree from LIU Post while training under Stella Adler, Bill Howey and Ivana Chubbuck. During this time, James trained under Betsy Parrish, who is known for training award-winning actress Meryl Streep. In 2005, the twins were named Top 25 to watch in indie film by Vanity Fair in their annual Rising Star campaign where they were featured alongside Oscar nominee Catalina Sandino Moreno and Lucas Black.

Career 
The brothers would move to Los Angeles to further pursue their career in film and quickly founded their own production company, Gaudioso Twin Films, which produces anything from commercials to feature-length projects. The brothers directed their first film in 2007, Medium, which caught the attention of New York socialite Cornelia Guest who ultimately referenced the twins to the editors of Vanity Fair. They collaborated with Jonathan Pryce in 2017 on the film, The Ghost and the Whale and the film would go on to receive the People's Choice Best Picture Award at the Hollywood Reel Independent Film Festival and Anthony was nominated to the Sag ballot for his role as Jack Lee. Later that year, the brothers co-wrote, starred and directed Duke, a western movie set in contemporary Los Angeles. James has twice auditioned to play the son of Daniel Day-Lewis, first in The Ballad of Jack and Rose and later as H.W. in There Will Be Blood The Gaudioso Twins will be directing the indie feature She's Still Here, which will begin principal photography in December 2020 and is set to star Mickey Rourke, Nick Stahl, Christina Ricci, and Jennifer Carpenter. The Twins are set to direct the meta slasher film The Skulleton in March, 2021.

Filmography

References

External links
 
 

American identical twin actors
American male film actors
American male television actors